Chaiduar College, established in 1967, is one of the oldest undergraduate, coeducational college situated in Gohpur of Chaiduar region, Assam. This college is affiliated with the Gauhati University. The college was subsequently placed under deficit grants-in-aids by Government of Assam in 1977. Science Stream was started in 1987 and was placed under deficit grants-in-aids in 1998. The college has introduced Commence Stream in the year 2012. Vocational courses are introduced in 2015. There are three distance learning centres in the College under the University IGNOU, KKHSOU and IDOL (University of Mumbai), GU. An advanced level Bio Tech Hub is also there in the College.

Departments

Science
Physics
Mathematics
Chemistry
Botany
Zoology

Arts and humanities
Language and Literature 
English
History
Education
Economics
Political Science

Commerce
Accountancy
Management

Vocational courses
Mass Media
Medical Laboratory Technician

Photos

References

External links
Chaiduar College

Universities and colleges in Guwahati
Colleges affiliated to Gauhati University
Educational institutions established in 1967
1967 establishments in Assam